The World Group was the highest level of Davis Cup competition in 2016. The first-round losers went into the Davis Cup World Group Play-offs, and the winners progressed to the quarterfinals and World Group spot for 2017.

Participating teams

Seeds

Draw

First round

Great Britain vs. Japan

Murray's win over Nishikori was the joint longest match of his career at 4 hours and 54 minutes, along with the 2012 US Open final, until his davis cup semi-final tie with Del Potro.

Serbia vs. Kazakhstan

Italy vs. Switzerland

Poland vs. Argentina

France vs. Canada

Germany vs. Czech Republic

Australia vs. United States

Belgium vs. Croatia

Quarterfinals

Serbia vs. Great Britain

Italy vs. Argentina

Czech Republic vs. France

United States vs. Croatia

Semifinals

Great Britain vs. Argentina

Croatia vs. France

Final

Croatia vs. Argentina

References

World Group